This list comprises all players who have participated in at least one league match for FC Montreal since the team's first USL season in 2015.

A "†" denotes players who only appeared in a single match.

A
 Yacine Ait-Slimane
 Eric Alexander †

B
 Kyle Bekker †
 Louis Béland-Goyette
 Nazim Belguendouz
 Mitchel Bringolf

C
 Hassoun Camara
 Janouk Charbonneau
 Kenny Cooper †
 Maxime Crépeau

D
 John Dinkota
 Marco Dominguez
 Samuel Duffek †

F
 Yann-Alexandre Fillion

G
 Jérémy Gagnon-Laparé
 Jems Geffrard
 Jonathan Grant

H
 Jacques Haman
 Chakib Hocine
 Emad Houache

J
 Anthony Jackson-Hamel
 Charles Joly

K
 Mastanabal Kacher
 Eric Kronberg

L
 Frédéric Lajoie-Gravelle
 Wandrille Lefèvre
 Philippe Lincourt-Joseph
 Kevin Luarca

M
 Zakaria Messoudi
 Eric Miller †
 Aron Mkungilwa
 Fabio Morelli

N
 Victor N'Diaye

P
 David Paulmin

R
 Alessandro Riggi

S
 Zachary Sukunda

T
 Mélé Temguia

V
 Jonathan Vallée

W
 Romario Williams

Y
 Nevello Yoseke †

Z
 Franck Zoué

External links

Montreal
 
Association football player non-biographical articles